Kharkiv cluster bombing may refer to:

February 2022 Kharkiv cluster bombing
March 2022 Kharkiv cluster bombing
April 2022 Kharkiv cluster bombing